Graham Stuart may refer to:

Graham Stuart (politician) (born 1962), British Conservative Party politician
Graham Stuart (footballer) (born 1970), former English footballer

See also
Graham Stewart (born 1975), Scottish broadcaster